Football card may refer to trading cards related with diverse forms of team sport football, such as:

 American football card 
 Association football trading card
 Australian rules football card

Not to be confused with:
 Red and yellow cards, part of the Association football rules